Sergio Valdés (born 17 September 1978) is a Chilean rugby union footballer. He plays as a lock.

He moved to France, where he has been playing for Stade Aurillacois, Racing Métro 92 (2005-2007), FC Auch (2007-2011), Section Paloise (2011-2013) and SU Agen since 2013.

Valdes is an international player for Chile.

External links
Sergio Valdés Player Statistics

1978 births
Living people
Chilean rugby union players
Rugby union locks
Chilean expatriate rugby union players
Expatriate rugby union players in France
Chilean expatriate sportspeople in France
Chile international rugby union players
Stade Aurillacois Cantal Auvergne players
Racing 92 players
SU Agen Lot-et-Garonne players
Section Paloise players